Jeremy Kay is a singer/songwriter. He released his first album, Jeremy Kay, in 2000 and a second, Idol American, in 2003. He achieved some notability when his music was used in several soundtracks. His songs have been used in television series like Scrubs in its first season, and Numb3rs. He is based in California and his music is a mix of Indie, soul, folk and rock in a mostly electric/acoustic blend.

His third album, Talking to Me, was released on August 28, 2007, by his label 10 Spot.

External links
Official site
Jeremy Kay on Myspace

American singer-songwriters
American male singer-songwriters
Year of birth missing (living people)
Living people